Pha Daeng National Park, formerly known as Chiang Dao National Park, is a national park in Chiang Mai Province, Thailand. Established on 2 November 2000, the park covers 702,085 rai ~  of the Pha Daeng mountain areas of the Daen Lao Range near the border with Burma, just north of Chiang Dao Wildlife Sanctuary. The tallest summit is 1,794 m high Doi Puk Phakka.

Gallery

See also
Chiang Dao Wildlife Sanctuary
List of national parks of Thailand
List of Protected Areas Regional Offices of Thailand

References

External links

 
 Birdwatching, Doi Chiang Dao National Park

National parks of Thailand
Protected areas established in 2000
Geography of Chiang Mai province
Tourist attractions in Chiang Mai province
2000 establishments in Thailand
Daen Lao Range